Water skiing (Spanish:Esquí Acuático), for the 2013 Bolivarian Games, took place from 16 November to 19 November 2013.

Medal table
Key:

Medal summary

Men

Women

References

Events at the 2013 Bolivarian Games
2013 Bolivarian Games
Bol